Northampton Borough Council was the local authority for Northampton in Northamptonshire, England and was elected every four years. From the last boundary changes in 1999, 47 councillors were elected from 23 wards. The borough council was abolished in 2021, with the area becoming part of West Northamptonshire.

Political control
From the first election to the council in 1973 until its abolition in 2021, political control of the council was held by the following parties:

Leadership

The mayor of Northampton was the ceremonial figurehead for the borough council, and tended to be held by a different person each year. Political leadership was provided instead by the leader of the council. The leaders from 2002 until the council's abolition in 2021 were:

Jonathan Nunn subsequently became the first leader of the replacement West Northamptonshire Council.

Council elections
1973 Northampton Borough Council election
1976 Northampton Borough Council election
1979 Northampton Borough Council election (New ward boundaries)
1983 Northampton Borough Council election
1987 Northampton Borough Council election
1991 Northampton Borough Council election
1995 Northampton Borough Council election
1999 Northampton Borough Council election (New ward boundaries increased the number of seats by 4)
2003 Northampton Borough Council election
2007 Northampton Borough Council election
2011 Northampton Borough Council election (New ward boundaries)
2015 Northampton Borough Council election

Borough  result maps

By-election results

1995-1999

2003-2007

2007-2011

2015-2019

References

 By-election results

External links
Northampton Borough Council

 
Council elections in Northamptonshire
Politics of Northampton
District council elections in England